Disbarred is a 1939 American crime film about a crooked lawyer starring Gail Patrick and Robert Preston.  The supporting cast includes Otto Kruger, Virginia Vale and Sidney Toler. The movie was directed by film noir specialist Robert Florey.

Plot
Tyler Craden is disbarred by the legal profession after destroying evidence against his client, gangster Mardeen, following the murder of a cop.

While on vacation, Craden ends up in a town in which a murder trial is taking place. He is impressed by defense attorney Joan Carroll and gets her a job with a firm run by Roberts, a corrupt pal.

Bradley Kent, an honest prosecutor, is a rival and a suitor to Joan. She rejects marriage proposals from Kent and Craden but joins the district attorney's office to fight crime. Mardeen turns up and tries to blackmail Craden, who shoots him. The district attorney arrests Craden and Roberts, which frees Joan to continue her work and to marry Kent.

Cast

References

External links
 

1939 films
Films directed by Robert Florey
Film noir
Paramount Pictures films
American crime drama films
1939 crime drama films
American black-and-white films
1930s American films